Étoile may refer to:

Places
France
 Charles de Gaulle – Étoile, station of the Paris Métro
 Étoile-Saint-Cyrice, commune in the Hautes-Alpes department in France
 Étoile-sur-Rhône, commune in the Drôme department in France
 L'Étoile, Jura, commune in the Jura department in France
 L'Étoile, Somme, commune in the Somme department in France
 Marcy-l'Étoile, commune in the Rhône department in France
 Montceaux-l'Étoile, commune in the Saône-et-Loire department in France
 Massif de l'Étoile, mountain range north of Marseilles
 Place de l'Étoile, large road junction in Paris

Elsewhere
 Etoile, Kentucky, United States
 Etoile, Texas, United States
 Etoile Island, Marshall Islands, Micronesia
 Etoile Island (Seychelles), Amirante Islands, Seychelles

Music
 "L'étoile" (song), a 2016 song by Celine Dion
 "Etoile", a 2020 song by OH MY GIRL

The arts
 Étoile, leading ballet dancer (male or female) in a company
 Danseur Étoile, the highest rank a dancer can reach at the Paris Opera Ballet
 L'étoile (opera), 1877 operetta by Emmanuel Chabrier
 Etoile (film), 1989 film starring Jennifer Connelly

Transport
 Étoile (A 649), French naval schooner used as a training vessel
 French fluyt Étoile (1767), French fluyt, convoying ship of Bougainville's La Boudeuse

Football clubs
 Etoile Haïtienne, a Haitian association football club
 Étoile Sportive du Sahel, a Tunisian association football club
 Étoile FC, a French football club who played in the Singaporean S.League from 2010 to 2012
 L'Etoile de Morne-à-l'Eau, a Guadeloupean club playing in the Guadeloupe Division of Honour

Other
 L'Étoile AOC, appellation for wines made in the Jura wine region of France
 L'Étoile du Déséret, French periodical of LDS Church, later named L'Etoile